Watchdog Test House is a BBC television series that was first broadcast on BBC One from 10 March 2014 until 20 March 2015. The series shows Sophie Raworth explaining how household goods are tested and how to get the best value for money. In the first series, Lynn Faulds Wood investigates product safety and reveals previous Watchdog campaigns that have saved lives.

Production
BSI Group featured in four episodes of the first series, testing domestic cookers, windows and doors security, washing machines and cycle helmets. Filming took place at two of BSI's Testing Centres of Excellence; Loughborough and Hemel Hempstead. The Building Research Establishment featured in every episode of Watchdog Test House.

Episode list

Series 1 (2014)

Series 2 (2015)

References

External links
 
 

2014 British television series debuts
2015 British television series endings
Television shows set in the United Kingdom
Television series by BBC Studios
BBC high definition shows
BBC Television shows
British non-fiction television series
English-language television shows